La vía de oro is a 1931  Argentine film directed by Edmo Cominetti and produced and written by Arturo S. Mom.

Cast
 Lidia Arce		
 Alejandro Corvalán		
 Carlos Dux		
 Felipe Farah		
 Nedda Francy		
 Alberto Lliri		
 Clara Milani		
 Damián Méndez		
 Carlos Nahuel
 Pablo Cumo

References

External links
 

1931 films
1930s Spanish-language films
Argentine black-and-white films
1930s Argentine films